Colonna is a surname. Notable people with the surname include:

 Catherine Colonna (b. 1956), a French politician
 Colonna family, some of whom included in following list:
 Dominique Colonna (b. 1928), a French former football goalkeeper
 Fanny Colonna (1934–2014), Algerian sociologist and anthropologist
 Giacomo "Sciarra" Colonna (1270–1329), member of the powerful Colonna family
 Francesco Colonna (1433(?) – 1527) an Italian Dominican friar, author of Hypnerotomachia Poliphili
 Giovanni Colonna (archaeologist) (b. 1934), an Italian scholar of ancient Italy and, in particular, the Etruscan civilization.
 Giovanni Paolo Colonna (c.1637–1695), an Italian musician and composer
 Guido Colonna di Paliano (1908–1982), an Italian politician and European Commissioner.
 Jerry Colonna (disambiguation), multiple people
 Jerry Colonna (entertainer), American comedy writer and performer
 Jerry Colonna (financier), New York City venture capitalist
 Marcantonio Colonna (disambiguation)
 Marcantonio Colonna (1535–1584), Duke of Tagliacozzo and Duke and Prince of Paliano, was an Italian aristocrat who served as a Viceroy of Sicily in the service of the Spanish Crown, Spanish general, and Captain General of the Church
 Marcantonio I Colonna (1478–1522), condottiero, lord of Frascati
 Marcantonio V Colonna (1606/10–1659), Prince of Paliano
 Marco Antonio Colonna (1523–1597), cardinal
 Marcantonio Colonna (18th-century cardinal) (1724–1793)
 Marcantonio Colonna (born 1949), pen name of British historian and author Henry Sire
 Niccolò Turrisi Colonna (1817–1889), a Sicilian politician from Palermo
 Sarah Colonna, American stand-up comedian, and roundtable regular on Chelsea Lately
 Vittoria Colonna, 1490–1547, marchioness of Pescara, Italian noblewoman, poet, friend of Michelangelo
 Yvan Colonna (b. 1960) a Corsican nationalist

See also
 Gabrielle Colonna-Romano (1888–1981), French actress